Lege may refer to:

Places 

 Legé, a commune in the Loire-Atlantique department in western France
 Lège, a commune in the Haute-Garonne department in southwestern France
 Lège, a village in the commune of Lège-Cap-Ferret in the Gironde department in southwestern France

Other uses 

 lege, a colloquial term for legislature